Januario "Aric" del Rosario (January 1, 1940 – March 25, 2020) was a Filipino basketball player and coach who served as head coach of the UST Growling Tigers in the UAAP, Pampanga Dragons in the Metropolitan Basketball Association, the 2003 RP Men's Team in the Southeast Asian Games, and of the UPHSD Altas from 2012-2015; until he retired and was made a consultant of the team in the NCAA. He was also a consultant and assistant Coach of Toyota-Balintawak Road Kings in the Philippine Basketball League. He was the commissioner of the NCAA (Philippines) from 2009-2011. 

As a UST player, del Rosario was part of the 1964 Glowing goldies team that won the UAAP Basketball Championship that year together with Hector Hipolito, the coach of the Adamson team that battled UST in its last game of the eliminations of the 1993 season en route to the rare sweep, 14-0, that made UST the automatic champions that year.

Playing career
Del Rosario played for the collegiate basketball team of the University of Santo Tomas which participates in the UAAP Basketball Championship. Then-known as the Glowing Goldies, del Rosario was part of the squad which clinched the UAAP Season 27 men's basketball title.

Coaching career

University of Santo Tomas

The University of Santo Tomas (UST) Growling Tigers appointed del Rosario as their head coach in 1991. Under his tutelage, the UST Growling Tigers achieve success in the 1990s winning 4 straight championships from 1993 up to 1996. (UAAP Seasons 56 to 59) The first championship was won via a 14–0 sweep the year before the Final Four format was introduced in the University Athletic Association of the Philippines (UAAP). In the next three championships, they will beat the De La Salle Green Archers to make a dynasty in the UAAP. In 1997, their dreams of a 5-peat were spoiled as they lose to the De La Salle Green Archers (their finals opponent from 1994-1996) in the final 4 despite UST holding the twice to beat advantage against La Salle. It also signaled the end of the 4-year dominance of UST. In 1999, UST made it again to the finals with an 11–3 win-loss card only to lose again this time to a familiar foe, the De La Salle Green Archers courtesy of the game-tying three-point shot by Dino Aldeguer to send the game into overtime. In 2001, UST wasn't able to play in the final 4 for the first time in school's history (the format was implemented in 1994) but came back in 2002 together with Cyrus Baguio. The following year, UST didn't reach the final 4 for the second time and it signaled the end of his long coaching reign and later he was replaced by his assistant coach Nel Parado.

Alaska Milkmen
Del Rosario served as an assistant coach to Alaska Milkmen head coach Tim Cone helping the team's first ever PBA title when it won the Third Conference in 1991 and achieve a grand slam in the 1996 season by winning all three conference titles for that season.

Pampanga Dragons
Del Rosario was tasked to coach the Pampanga Dragons of the Metropolitan Basketball Association in 1998. He led the Dragons to their first and only MBA title during the league's inaugural season in the same year.

Philippine national team 
He has coached the Philippines men's national team which took part at the 2003 Southeast Asian Games helping the team clinch a gold medal in that edition of the regional championships.

Perpetual Altas 
Del Rosario returned to college basketball, this time coaching the Perpetual Altas in the National Collegiate Athletic Association (Philippines). Del Rosario started in 2012, off the Altas missing the previous season's playoffs with a 5–13 record. The team made it to the playoffs in the next three years. On his fourth year, the Altas missed the playoffs despite a 11–7 record.

Parañaque Patriots 
The Parañaque Patriots of the Maharlika Pilipinas Basketball League was coached by del Rosario in 2018.

Coaching record

Collegiate record

Personal life
The Del Rosario family is a basketball inclined family. Coach Aric's sons are involved in basketball. Edsel is a former player at UST while Lester is also a former player and former assistant coach to the JRU Heavy Bombers. His grandson, Zach (Lester's son) goes with him and his dad in UPHSD basketball practices and the young Del Rosario is showing a passion for basketball.

Death
Del Rosario died on March 25, 2020 due to cardiact arrest. He was 80 years old.

References

1940 births
2020 deaths
Filipino men's basketball coaches
Filipino men's basketball players
Philippines men's national basketball team coaches
UST Growling Tigers basketball players
Perpetual Altas basketball coaches
UST Growling Tigers basketball coaches
Alaska Aces (PBA) coaches
TNT Tropang Giga coaches